Callidrepana pulcherrima is a moth of the family Drepanidae. It is found in Burma, Peninsular Malaysia, Sumatra and Borneo.

References

Drepaninae
Moths described in 1893